The 1980 Tournament of the Americas, since 2005 called the FIBA Americas Championship or the FIBA AmeriCup, was the inaugural edition of this basketball tournament, and it was hosted by Puerto Rico in San Juan from April 18 to April 25, 1980. The berths allocated to the Americas for the 1980 Summer Olympics in Moscow were determined.  The United States did not participate in the tournament.  Puerto Rico won the tournament by going 5-1 in the round robin.  Because of the U.S.-led boycott of the 1980 Summer Olympic Games, eventual berths went to Brazil, the fourth-place finisher, and Cuba, the sixth-place finisher.

Competing nations
The following national teams competed:

Squads

Preliminary rounds

Standings

 Puerto Rico wins gold medal based on head-to-head victory over Canada.  Argentina wins bronze medal based on head-to-head victory over Brazil.

April 18, 1980

April 19, 1980

April 20, 1980

April 21, 1980

April 23, 1980

April 24, 1980

April 25, 1980

References
 FIBA Archive

FIBA AmeriCup
1980 in Puerto Rican sports
International basketball competitions hosted by Puerto Rico
1979–80 in North American basketball
1979–80 in South American basketball